Sport of Kings may refer to:
 One of several sports historically associated with royalty or nobility:
 Hunting, especially the following kinds:
 Mounted hunting with hounds, e.g. fox hunting 
 Hunting with hounds on foot, e.g. beagling and montería
 Falconry
 Deer stalking
 Polo
 Real tennis
 Horse racing
 Sport of Kings (film), 1947 American film
 The Sport of Kings (1921 film), British silent sports film
 The Sport of Kings (1931 film), British comedy
 The Sport of Kings (album), album by Triumph
 The Sport of Kings (novel), a 2016 novel by C. E. Morgan
 The Sport of Kings (play), a 1924 play by Ian Hay
 Sport of Kings, album by English band Pele